Alan Michael Lapsley, SSM (born 2 June 1949) is a South African Anglican priest and social justice activist.

Personal life 
Alan Michael Lapsley was born on 2 June 1949 in New Zealand. He was ordained to the priesthood in Australia where he joined the Anglican religious order the Society of the Society of the Sacred Mission (SSM).

In 1973 he arrived in Durban, South Africa, as an undergraduate student. Soon thereafter, during the height of apartheid repression, he became a chaplain to students at both black and white universities in Durban. In 1976, he began to speak out on behalf of schoolchildren who were being shot, detained and tortured.

Social justice and anti-apartheid activism 
1976 was the year of the Soweto Uprising, which sparked protests across the country. Fr Michael, as he was known, took a stand as national chaplain to Anglican students, a position he held at the time.

In September 1976, he was expelled from the country. He went to live in Lesotho, where he continued his studies and became a member of the African National Congress and a chaplain to the organization in exile. During this period he traveled the world, mobilizing faith communities, in particular, to oppose apartheid and support the liberation struggle.

Letter bomb 
After a police raid in Maseru in 1982 in which 42 people were killed, he moved to Zimbabwe. It was here that in 1990, three months after ANC leader Nelson Mandela's release from prison, he was sent a letter bomb by the apartheid regime. It was hidden inside two religious magazines. He lost both hands and the sight in one eye in the blast, and was seriously burnt.

On his return to South Africa in 1992 he helped to start the association Friends of Cuba and later became its first national president. He was awarded the Cuban Friendship Medal by the Cuban Council of State.

Post-apartheid work 

In 1993, he became Chaplain of the Trauma Centre for Victims of Violence and Torture in Cape Town, which assisted the country's Truth and Reconciliation Commission (TRC). This work led to the establishment, in 1998, of the Institute for Healing of Memories (IHOM) in Cape Town. The IHOM aims to allow many more South Africans to tell their stories in workshops where they work through their trauma.

The IHOM is based in Cape Town, South Africa, but Fr Michael has worked in many other countries, in Africa and across the world. The organisation now works with groups including those affected by political violence; those affected and infected by HIV and AIDS; refugees and asylum seekers; prisoners and war veterans. The IHOM is also a not for profit organisation in the United States.

Lapsley is a graduate of the Australian College of Theology, the National University of Lesotho and the University of Zimbabwe. He has 6 honorary doctorates from the Macquarie University in Sydney, Australia, the University of KwaZulu-Natal and the University of the Western Cape in South Africa and Liverpool Hope University in the United Kingdom, and the Virginia Theological Seminary in the United States, and Rhodes University in South Africa and He has been awarded the Queen's Service Medal by the Government of New Zealand for service to Southern African communities. He is also Honorary Consul for New Zealand in Cape Town for 18 years.

He was the subject of the biographical work Priest and Partisan: A South African Journey (1996) by his fellow South African priest and theologian Michael Worsnip, with a foreword by Nelson Mandela.

The Government of the Western Cape awarded him the Order of the Disa.

Nelson Mandela said of him, "Michael’s life represents a compelling metaphor: We read about a foreigner who came to our country and was transformed by what he saw of the injustices of apartheid. His life is part of the tapestry of many long journeys and struggles of our people and "Michael Lapsley's life is part of the tapestry of the many long journeys and struggles of our people." 

Fr Michael was vice president of the South African Council of Churches from 2014 - 2017.

International Network for Peace 
For the fifth anniversary of 9/11 ( held on 8 September 2006), Lapsley joined more than 30 terror victims from all around the world and families of those killed in the 11 September attacks to create the International Network for Peace to promote effective and nonviolent solutions to terrorism.

Electronic Media 
There are many video interviews with him on the internet including on YouTube in particular The Father Michael Lapsley Story

Publications

Books by or about  Fr. Michael Lapsley SSM 
 Lapsley, M. (1986). 
Wornisp, M. E. (1996). 
 Lapsley, M., & Karakashian, S. (2012).

Contributions in other publications 
 What Apartheid Has Done to All of Us, Black and White. American Committee on Africa. 1991.
 
 Confronting the Past and Creating the Future: The Redemptive Value of Truth Telling". Social Research 65 (4): 741–758. Winter 1998. JSTOR 40971285. 
 
 The Journey to and from Apology: Restoring the Moral Order in  Journal For Social Research: An International Quarterly Winter 2020.
 Tutu and Me: Perspectives on brokenness and wholeness in Ecumenical Encounters with Desmond Mpilo Tutu   UWC Press ISBN 978-1-990995- 06-4 2021.
 The Role of Faith Communities in moral regeneration: a time for introspection in Leadership Magazine July 2021.
 Healing old wounds of Women and Men to end gender based violence and femicide in Leadership Magazine August 2021
 The Pain caused by the demonization of African culture at the altar of Apartheid and Colonization in Leadership Magazine November 2021.
 The ANC's Church Front in  International Brigade against Apartheid: Secrets of the People's War that Liberated ]South Africa Jacana 2021  ISBN 978-1-4314-3202-8 December 2021

See also 
 Desmond Tutu
 Albie Sachs
 John Osmers

Notes

References

External links 
 The Forgiveness Project
 Institute for Healing Memories

1949 births
Living people
20th-century South African Anglican priests
21st-century South African Anglican priests
New Zealand emigrants to South Africa
Recipients of the Queen's Service Medal
White South African anti-apartheid activists